The Royal Box (German: Die Königsloge) is a 1929 American historical film directed by Bryan Foy and starring Alexander Moissi, Camilla Horn and Lew Hearn. It is an adaptation of the play Kean by Alexandre Dumas about the life of the British actor Edmund Kean.

It was made by Warner Brothers as a German-language film using the Vitaphone process. In Germany the film was released by the studio's local subsidiary National Film.

Cast
 Alexander Moissi as Edmund Kean 
 Camilla Horn as Alice Doren 
 Lew Hearn as Salomon 
 Elsa Ersi as Countess Toeroek 
 William F. Schoeller as H.R.H., The Prince of Wales 
 Egon Brecher as Count Toeroek 
 Leni Stengel as Lady Robert 
 Carlos Zizold as Lord Melvill 
 Greta Meyer as Mrs. Barker 
 Sig Ruman as Bailiff 
 William Gade as Tommy Widgetts

References

Bibliography
 Michael Schaudig. Positionen deutscher Filmgeschichte. Diskurs-Film-Verlag, 1996.

External links

1929 films
1920s historical films
American historical films
1920s German-language films
Films directed by Bryan Foy
Films based on works by Alexandre Dumas
American films based on plays
Films set in London
Films set in the 19th century
Films about actors
Warner Bros. films
National Film films
American black-and-white films
1920s American films